Hype (derived from hyperbole) is promotion, especially promotion consisting of exaggerated claims.   

Hype or The Hype may also refer to:

Film and television
 Hype (TV series), an American comedy television series
 The Hype (TV series), an Australian television series
 The Hype (2021 TV series), an American reality television series
 Hype!, a documentary about the popularity of grunge rock in the early to mid 1990s

Music
 The Hype (band), fronted by David Bowie
 "The Hype", an early name of the Irish rock band U2
 DJ Hype, British drum and bass DJ
 Hype Williams (born 1970), music video director
 Hype (album), 1981 album by Robert Calvert
 Hype! (soundtrack), a 1996 soundtrack to the Hype! documentary
 "Hype" (song), a 2016 single by Dizzee Rascal and Calvin Harris
 "Hype", a 2016 song by Drake from the album Views 
 "The Hype", a 2011 song by The New Cities from the album Kill the Lights 
 "The Hype" (Shopping song), a 2017 song from the album The Official Body
 "The Hype" (Twenty One Pilots song), a 2019 song from the album Trench

Other uses
 Hype (magazine), South African magazine
 Hype (marketing)
 Hype: The Time Quest, a 1999 PC role-playing game by Playmobil
 Hype Energy, brand of high-energy drinks 
 Skywalk Hype, a German paraglider design